The United States Air Force's  28th Intelligence Squadron is an intelligence unit located at Hurlburt Field, Florida. The 28th Intelligence Squadron is a classic reserve associate unit supporting the 25th Intelligence Squadron conducting airborne intelligence, surveillance and reconnaissance to provide threat warning to Air Force Special Operations Command.  The squadron was previously active during World War II in the Pacific Theater, providing photographic support to a very heavy bomber group and in the early years of the Cold War as a photographic processing and interpretation unit for a strategic reconnaissance wing.

Mission
The squadron is the first reserve tactical systems operator squadron. Its mission is to organize and train personnel to deliver specialized analysis directly to Air Force special operations forces, provide equipment maintenance and configuration, analysis and dissemination, airborne intelligence, surveillance and reconnaissance, and operational support.

History

World War II
The 28th Photographic Laboratory was activated at Dalhart Army Air Field and assigned to the 501st Bombardment Group, a Boeing B-29 Superfortress unit.   After training in the United States under Second Air Force the unit deployed to the Pacific Theater in April 1945, where it was stationed at Northwest Field, Guam as an element of the 315th Bombardment Wing of XXI Bomber Command.  The unit received a Distinguished Unit Citation for its support of the 501st Group's attacks on the Maruzen oil refinery at Shimotsu, the Utsubo oil refinery at Yokkaichi, and the petroleum center at Kawasaki.  The 28th remained on Guam after V-J Day until it was inactivated in February 1946.

Cold War
The 28th Reconnaissance Technical Squadron was activated at Rapid City Air Force Base on 1 May 1950, shortly after the 28th Bombardment Wing began to convert to Convair RB-36 Peacemakers as the 28th Strategic Reconnaissance Wing. The squadron took part in Operation Tumbler–Snapper, atmospheric nuclear weapons tests, from 1 April to 5 June 1952 by providing aerial and ground technical and training photography and motion pictures of various operations for the Defense Nuclear Agency.  The squadron was inactivated in 1955 when the 28th Wing returned to a primary bombardment mission.

Reserve associate unit
The 28th Squadron was redesignated the 28th Intelligence Squadron and activated in March 2014 as a reserve associate unit of the 25th Intelligence Squadron at Hurlburt Field, Florida.  Six months later, the squadron was consolidated with the World War II photographic laboratory.  The squadron achieved full operational capability in April 2016.  Squadron operators perform their mission primarily aboard Pilatus U-28 surveillance aircraft.

Lineage
 28th Photographic Laboratory
 Constituted as the 28th Photographic Laboratory, Bombardment Group, Very Heavy on 25 May 1944
 Activated on 1 August 1944
 Inactivated on 22 February 1946
 Disbanded on 8 October 1948
 Reconstituted and consolidated with the 28th Intelligence Squadron as the 28th Intelligence Squadron on 18 September 2014

 28th Intelligence Squadron
 Constituted as the 28th Reconnaissance Technical Squadron on 3 March 1950
 Activated on 1 May 1950
 Inactivated on 15 April 1955
 Redesignated 28th Intelligence Squadron on 19 March 2014
 Activated on 17 April 2014
 Consolidated with the 28th Photographic Laboratory on 18 September 2014

Assignments
  501st Bombardment Group, 1 August 1944 – 22 February 1946
 28th Strategic Reconnaissance Wing, 1 May 1950 – 15 April 1955
 655th Intelligence, Surveillance, and Reconnaissance Group, 17 April 2014 – present

Stations
 Dalhart Army Air Field, Texas, 1 August 1944
 Harvard Army Air Field, Nebraska, 23 August 1944
 Fort Lawton, Washington, 10–17 March 1945
 Hawaii, 25 March 1945
 Tinian, c. April 1945
 Northwest Field, Guam, c. 14 Apr 1945 – 22 February 1946
 Rapid City Air Force Base (later Ellsworth Air Force Base), South Dakota, 1 May 1950 – 15 April 1955
 Hurlburt Field, Florida, 17 April 2014 – present

Awards and campaigns

References

Notes
 Explanatory notes

 Citations

Bibliography
 
 
 

Military units and formations in Florida
0028